Natasha Wong (born 13 November 1967) is a former New Zealand rugby union player. She represented New Zealand at the inaugural 1991 Women's Rugby World Cup.

Career 
Wong represented Canterbury provincially. She was appointed as a member of the Canterbury Rugby Football Union board. Since 2011, she has been the team manager for the Canterbury Women's team in the Farah Palmer Cup.

References

External links
Black Ferns Profile

1967 births
Living people
New Zealand women's international rugby union players
New Zealand female rugby union players